Halmstad (Niklas angående Niklas) is the fifth album by Shining. It was released by Osmose Productions on 16 April 2007. A black LP edition was released and limited to 500 copies.

Track 1 starts with the beginning verses of "Antigonish", an 1889 poem by William Hughes Mearns: 

Track 5 is an arrangement of Ludwig van Beethoven's "Moonlight Sonata". Several lines by Christina Ricci from the movie Prozac Nation were sampled in this album.

Track listing

Personnel
 Niklas Kvarforth – vocals
 Fredric Gråby – guitar
 Peter Huss – guitar
 Johan Hallander – bass
 Ludwig Witt – drums
 Marcus Pålsson – grand piano on "Åttiosextusenfyrahundra"
 Ynas Lindskog – lyrics on "Låt oss ta allt från varandra"

References

2007 albums
Shining (Swedish band) albums
Osmose Productions albums